Leptanilla swani is a species of ant in the genus Leptanilla. Described by William Morton Wheeler in 1932, the species is endemic to Australia, and the only species of the genus Leptanilla to be found there.

References

External links
 

Leptanillinae
Hymenoptera of Australia
Insects described in 1932